Lakeside railway station is situated on the Puffing Billy Railway in Melbourne, Australia.  It was opened in 1944 to serve Emerald Lake Park, a popular picnic and recreation reserve created during World War II. The station originally consisted of a short single-face platform on the Up side of the line, approximately on the site of the current locomotive water tanks. It had a name board and a red flag for intending passengers to signal to the train crew, but no shelter.

Lakeside today is a staff station, with a passing loop, island platform and waiting shelters.  A booking office and refreshment room is across the track on what was the post-reopening single-face platform.  There is also a second loop siding beyond the former park access road for the single-face third platform which services the Visitor Centre. A short, dead-end spur extends past the Down end of this loop siding.

Of interest is a working wig-wag level crossing warning signal, which operates at the former park access road between the platform and storage siding.  It is believed to be the only regularly operating wig-wag signal in Victoria.

Australia's biggest model railway, the Emerald Lake Model Railway, is located near the station.

References

External links
 Melway map at street-directory.com.au

Tourist railway stations in Melbourne
Railway stations in the Shire of Yarra Ranges